

Kin usually refers to kinship and family.

Kin or KIN may also refer to:

Culture and religion 

Otherkin, people who identify as not entirely human 
Kinism, a white supremacist religious movement
 Kinh, the majority ethnic group of Vietnam

Places
 Kin empires and dynasties of China, now romanized as Jin
Kin, Okinawa, a town in Okinawa, Japan
 Kin, Pakistan, a village along the Indus in Pakistan 
 Kin, Ye, a village in Ye Township, Myanmar
 Kin, Mogok, a village in Mogok Township, Myanmar

Arts, entertainment, and media

Music
 Kin (iamamiwhoami album), 2012
 KIN (KT Tunstall album),  2016
 Kin (Pat Metheny album), 2014
 Kin (Mogwai album), 2018
 Kin (Xentrix album), 1992
 Kin (Whitechapel album), 2021

Film 

 Kin, a 2000 South African-British film by Elaine Proctor
 Kin (film), a 2018 American science fiction film

Television 
 "Kin" (Justified), a 2013 episode
 "Kin" (The Last of Us), a 2023 episode
 Kin (Irish TV series), crime drama set in Dublin
 Kin (Singaporean TV series), a Singaporean TV drama series

Other arts, entertainment, and media
 The Kin, a group of women in the novel series The Wheel of Time
 Kin (comics), a 2000 comic-book limited series by Gary Frank
 "Kin" (short story), a 2006 short story by Bruce McAllister

Organizations
 Kin Canada, a Canadian non-profit service organization
 Kids In Need Foundation or KIN

Transportation
 Kingston Railroad Station (Rhode Island)'s Amtrak station code, KIN
 Norman Manley International Airport's IATA Code, KIN

Other uses
 KIN (gene), a gene for a DNA/RNA binding protein
 Kin (mass), a Japanese unit of mass
 Kin, a cryptocurrency token by Kik Interactive
 Kinyarwanda language's ISO 639 code, KIN
 Kin or rin, a Japanese standing bell
 K'in, a day in the Maya Calendar
 Microsoft Kin, a family of social networking phones developed by Microsoft

See also
 Jin (disambiguation), formerly romanized as kin in Chinese contexts
 Ken (disambiguation)
 Kin selection, an evolutionary strategy that favors the reproductive success of an organism's relatives